Salgueiro is a city in Pernambuco, Brazil. It is located in the mesoregion of Sertão Pernambucano . Salgueiro covers an area of 1687 square kilometers and had in 2020 an estimated population of 61,249 inhabitants.

It is the see city of the Roman Catholic Diocese of Salgueiro, a suffragan see of the Roman Catholic Archdiocese of Olinda e Recife.

Geography
 State - Pernambuco
 Region - Sertão Pernambucano
 Boundaries - Ceará  (N);  Belém de São Francisco (S), Verdejante, Mirandiba and Carnaubeira da Penha  (E); Cabrobó, Terra Nova, Serrita and Cedro  (W)
 Area - 1639.3 km2
 Elevation - 420 m
 Hydrography - Terra Nova River
 Vegetation - Forest Subcaducifólia.
 Climate - Semi desertic, ( Sertão) - hot and dry
 Main road -  BR 232
 Distance to Recife - 510 km

Economy

The main economic activities in Salgueiro are based in general commerce and agribusiness, especially plantations of onions, cotton and tomatoes; and creations of cattle, goats, sheep and pigs.

Economic Indicators

Economy by Sector
2006

Health Indicators

References

 
Municipalities in Pernambuco